The Identity card BES (locally also known as sedula) is a uniform identity card for residents in the Caribbean Netherlands introduced upon the dissolution of the Netherlands Antilles in 2010. The cards are machine-readable and have the size of a credit card. The front contains the words Identiteitskaart followed by the island names Bonaire, Sint Eustatius and Saba (with the name of the island where the card is issued in larger font and bold face). The card also contains the coat of arms of the island of issue.

Legal basis
The legal basis is the Dutch law on BES identity cards which is derived from the corresponding law on the Netherlands Antilles.

The card is only valid in the Caribbean Netherlands, not in the European Netherlands.

Physical appearance
The card contains 12 numbered fields on the front with explanation on the back in Dutch, English, and Papiamento:
 Surname
 Given names
 Date of Birth
 Place of Birth
 Sex
 Nationality (for Dutch: NLD, the card is also issued to non-Dutch residents)
 ID number
 Card Number
 Status
 Date of Issue
 Date of Expiry
 Signature
The machine-readable strip starts with I<NLD as does the Dutch identity card.

Relation to other identity cards
The identity card of the Netherlands Antilles issued in Bonaire was machine-readable upon transition, whereas cards issued on Sint Eustatius and Saba were older and less secure. The last of those cards expired by 1 July 2011. Furthermore, the possibility will be investigated to replace the card by the Dutch identity card.

See also
Dutch identity card

References

Caribbean special municipalities of the Netherlands
Netherlands (BES)